The 2014 Aegon Trophy was a professional tennis tournament played on outdoor grass courts. It was the sixth edition of the tournament which was part of the 2014 ATP Challenger Tour and the 2014 ITF Women's Circuit. It took place in Nottingham, United Kingdom, on 2–8 June 2014.

ATP entrants

Singles

Seeds 

 1 Rankings as of 26 May 2014

Other entrants 
The following players received wildcards into the singles main draw:
  Daniel Cox
  Kyle Edmund
  Daniel Smethurst
  David Rice

The following players received entry from the qualifying draw:
  Marcus Willis
  Ben Mitchell
  John-Patrick Smith
  Michael Venus

Doubles

Seeds 

 1 Rankings as of 26 May 2014

Other entrants 
The following pairs received wildcards into the doubles main draw:
  Lewis Burton /  Marcus Willis
  David Rice /  Sean Thornley
  Edward Corrie /  Daniel Smethurst

The following pair received entry from the qualifying draw:
  Austin Krajicek /  Rhyne Williams

WTA entrants

Singles main-draw entrants

Seeds 

 1 Rankings as of 26 May 2014

Other entrants 
The following players received wildcards into the singles main draw:
  Naomi Broady
  Katy Dunne
  Tara Moore
  Emily Webley-Smith

The following players received entry from the qualifying draw:
  Eleni Daniilidou
  Anett Kontaveit
  Noppawan Lertcheewakarn
  Marta Sirotkina

The following players received entry into the singles main draw as lucky losers:
  Julia Boserup
  Risa Ozaki
  Anastasia Rodionova
  Arina Rodionova

Doubles

Seeds 

 1 Rankings as of 26 May 2014

Other entrants 
The following pairs received wildcards into the doubles main draw:
  Samantha Murray /  Jade Windley
  Johanna Konta /  Tara Moore
  Nicola Slater /  Emily Webley-Smith

Champions

Men's singles 

  Marcos Baghdatis def.  Marinko Matosevic, 6–4, 6–3

Women's singles 

  Kristýna Plíšková def.  Zarina Diyas, 6–2, 3–6, 6–4

Men's doubles 

  Chris Guccione /  Rajeev Ram def.  Colin Fleming /  Andre Sá, 6–7(2–7), 6–2, [11–9]

Women's doubles 

  Jocelyn Rae /  Anna Smith def.  Sharon Fichman /  Maria Sanchez, 7–6(7–5), 4–6, [10–5]

External links 
 
 2014 Aegon Trophy at ITFtennis.com

2014 ITF Women's Circuit
2014 ATP Challenger Tour
2014
2014 in English tennis